The following is a list of the sixty-seven county seats of the Commonwealth of Pennsylvania.  The list includes forty-two boroughs, twenty-four cities, and one town.  The ranking is based on the populations of each county seat during the 2010 census.

See also
List of municipalities in Pennsylvania

References